South Africans have been participated in various running events 100 kilometres and longer. Some is on road, track or trail. The statistics below show the best performances irrespective of the surface.

100 km

The current world scenario is as follows;

Men World record: Ritchie, D. 6:10:20, Date: 28 October 1978, London United Kingdom.

Women World record: Abe, T. 6:33:11, Date: 25 June 2000, Ybetsu- Saroma- Tokara, Japan.

The top 3 South African performances were:

100 miles

The current world scenario is as follows;

Men World record: Bitter, Z 11:19:18, Date: 25 August 2019, Milwaukee, USA

Women World record : Herron, C. 12:42:40, Date: 11 November 2017, Vienna IL USA

The top 3 South African performances were:

24 Hour running

The current world scenario is as follows;

Men World record : Kouros, Y. 303.50 km, Date: 5 October 1997, Adelaide Australia

Women World record : Herron, C 260.6 km Date: 9 December 2018, Phoenix, USA

The top 3 South African performances were:

48 Hour running
The current world scenario is as follows;

Men World record : Kouros, Y. 473.49 km, Date: 5 May 1996, Surgeres France

Women World record : Inagaki, S. 397.10 Date: 23 May 2010, Surgeres, France

The top South Africans are:

6 Days running

The current world scenario is as follows;

Men World record : Kouros, Y. 1036.8 km, Date: 26 November 2005

Women World record : Barwick, S. 883.63 km Date: 24 November 1990, Campbelltown, Australia

The top South Africans are:

24 hour mile relay

The rules are as follows:

A team consist out of ten runners. Each runner runs a mile, before the second person takes over. Runners needs to run in sequence and if a runner cannot run, that runners falls out and the team gets reduced. The minimum runners left must be two.

The current world scenario is as follows;

Men world record: Team- Puma Tyneside Running Club of Great Britain; Date- 11 September 1994; Location- Jarrow; Distance 302 miles 375 yards.

Women world record: Team- LG Kappelberg of Germany; Date- 1982; Location- Mörlenbach; Distance 235 miles 816 yards.

The top South African are:

References

 
South African ultramarathon runners